The Men's 1 km time trial track cycling events at the 2008 Summer Paralympics took place on September 7–9 at the Laoshan Velodrome.

Classification
Cyclists are given a classification depending on the type and extent of their disability. The classification system allows cyclists to compete against others with a similar level of function.

Cycling classes are:
B&VI 1–3: Blind and visually impaired cyclists
LC 1–4: Cyclists with a locomotor disability
CP 1–4: Cyclists with cerebral palsy

B&VI 1–3
The men's 1 km time trial (B&VI 1–3) took place on September 8.

WR = World Record

CP 3
The men's 1 km time trial (CP 3) took place on September 9 September.

WR = World Record

CP 4
The men's 1 km time trial (CP 4) took place on 9 September.

WR = World Record

LC 1
The men's 1 km time trial (LC 1) took place on 9 September.

WR = World Record

LC 2
The men's 1 km time trial (LC 2) took place on 9 September.

WR = World Record

LC 3–4
The men's 1 km time trial (LC 3–4) took place on 7 September.

References 

Men's time trial